The Miura-class landing ship tank is a class of three tank landing ships (LSTs) that served with the Japanese Maritime Self-Defense Force (JMSDF) from 1975 to 2002. They were primarily deployed for logistic support but were also be used to carry heavy construction equipment such as trenchers.

Description
This gave them a maximum speed of 

Vessels of the class carried two Landing Craft Vehicle Personnel (LCVPs) and two Landing Craft Mechanized (LCMs). The LCVPs were slung under davits and a traveling gantry crane with folding rails that could be extended over the side handled the two LCMs positioned on the foredeck. The Miura class were armed with twin-mounted US Mark 33 /50 caliber guns situated forward in a single turret and a twin-mounted  guns in a single turret placed aft. The LSTs were equipped with OPS-14 air search and OPS-16 surface search radar. For fire control, Miura mounted a 72-1B for the 76 mm guns and US Mk 51 fire control for the 40 mm guns. The other two vessels were equipped with US Mk 63 fire control for the 76 mm guns and US Mk 51 for the 40 mm guns. They had a complement of 118 officers and crew.

Ships in the class

Service history
Three tank landing ships were ordered from Ishikawajima-Harima Heavy Industries and constructed in Tokyo, Japan. The first of the class, Miura entered service in 1975 with the Japanese Maritime Self Defense Force (JMSDF), with Ojika following in 1976 and Satsuma in 1977. Primarily used for logistic support, the Miura class has also been used to trial new guns for the JMSDF, which Satsuma did with the OTO Melara 76 mm Compact gun.

Citations

References

External links

 Miura class at Globalsecurity.org

Amphibious warfare vessels of the Japan Maritime Self-Defense Force
Tank landing ships
Amphibious warfare vessel classes